Nikolai Matveyevich Velikov (born June 6, 1945 in Nerekhta) is a Russian pair skating coach.

Velikov competed with his wife Ludmila Sinitsina, placing fifth at the Soviet Championships. Velikov later retired from competitive skating and became the coach of his wife with Anatoly Yevdokimov, a team who won bronze medals at the 1972 USSR Cup and 1973 RSFSR.

Velikov and his wife, now known as Ludmila Velikova, are based in Saint Petersburg, Russia.

Their current students include:
 Anastasia Mishina / Aleksandr Galiamov
 Polina Kostiukovich / Dmitrii Ialin
 Kseniia Akhanteva / Valerii Kolesov

Their former students include:
 Anastasia Mishina / Vladislav Mirzoev
 Evgenia Shishkova / Vadim Naumov
 Maria Petrova / Anton Sikharulidze
 Maria Petrova / Alexei Tikhonov
 Ekaterina Vasilieva / Alexander Smirnov
 Maria Mukhortova / Maxim Trankov
 Julia Obertas / Alexei Sokolov
 Julia Obertas / Sergei Slavnov
 Ksenia Stolbova / Fedor Klimov

Awards 
Master of Sports of the USSR
Honored Coach of Russia

References 

1945 births
Living people
People from Kostroma Oblast
Soviet male pair skaters
Russian figure skating coaches
Figure skaters from Saint Petersburg